Bernard Johan Christiaan te Hennepe (4 October 1884 – 30 July 1955) was a Dutch rower. He competed in the men's eight event at the 1920 Summer Olympics.

References

External links
 

1884 births
1955 deaths
Dutch male rowers
Olympic rowers of the Netherlands
Rowers at the 1920 Summer Olympics
People from Winterswijk
Sportspeople from Gelderland
20th-century Dutch people